The 2019 NCAA Division II Cross Country Championships was the 62nd annual NCAA Men's Division II Cross Country Championship and the 39th annual NCAA Women's Division II Cross Country Championship to determine the team and individual national champions of NCAA Division II men's and women's collegiate cross country running in the United States. In all, four different titles were contested: men's and women's individual and team championships. Results were track and field results reporting system. In the men's 10k, Ezra Mutai of American International College took home the individual title in 29:31.2, while Colorado School of Mines won the team title, scoring 57 points and defeating second-placed Adams State University (136) and third-placed California State University, Chico (143). In the women's 6k, Stephanie Cotter of the Adams State University won the individual title in 19:15.5, while Adams State University won the team title with 23 points, beating second-placed Grand Valley State University (87) and third-placed Colorado School of Mines (133).

Women's title
Distance: 6,000 meters

Women's Team Result (Top 10)

Women's Individual Result (Top 10)

Men's title
Distance: 10,000 meters

Men's Team Result (Top 10)

Men's Individual Result (Top 10)

See also
 NCAA Men's Division I Cross Country Championship 
 NCAA Women's Division I Cross Country Championship 
 NCAA Men's Division II Cross Country Championship 
 NCAA Women's Division II Cross Country Championship 
 NCAA Men's Division III Cross Country Championship 
 NCAA Women's Division III Cross Country Championship

References
 

NCAA Cross Country Championships
NCAA Division II Cross Country Championships
NCAA Division II Cross Country Championships